Saaluncifera is a genus of moths of the family Noctuidae from Africa.

Species
 Saaluncifera lamottei Laporte, 1972
 Saaluncifera uncinata (Saalmüller, 1891)

References

Hadeninae